Erik Jørgensen is a Danish furniture company. It has its own design team and also works with external designers.

History
Erik Jørgensen founded his company as a small workshop in Svendborg in 1954. Within a few years, the company developed into a well-reputed furniture upholstering company.

Designers
 Foersom and Hiort-Lorenzen
 Louise Campbell
 Poul M. Volther
 Anne-Mette Jensen and Morten Ernst 
 Niels Gammelgaard
 Hans Wegner
 David Lewis
 Erik Ole Jørgensen
 Jørgen Gammelgaard
 Tine Mouritsen and Mia Sinding
 Hannes Wettstein

Furniture
 Ox chair (Wegner)
 Corona chair (Volther)
 In Duplo sofa (Jensen & Ernst)

Awards
 Wallpaper Design Award (sofa category) for *In Duplo sofa

References

External links
 Official website

Furniture companies of Denmark
Design companies established in 1954
1954 establishments in Denmark
Manufacturing companies established in 1954
Danish companies established in 1954